Margarita Gallegos Soto (born 19 October 1942) is a Mexican politician from the Institutional Revolutionary Party. From 2009 to 2012 she served as Deputy of the LXI Legislature of the Mexican Congress representing Aguascalientes.

She has served as Municipal President of San Francisco de los Romo, since 2014, turning her mandate into a kind of dictatorship and what makes her the person who has governed a municipality for the most years at the national level, with 8 uninterrupted years and currently going through 3 more, which will add 11 years of continuous government and this does not seem to end.

Currently, hard work is being done for the management of a new airport in the community of El Puertecito de la Virgen, due to the high demand in this place and the high levels of tourism, it is planned that the airport will be named "International Airport of the Virgin" (AIV), in this This place is planned to land all kinds of planes, especially the super jumbos of cargo and passengers, in this way jobs will be created for the entity, in addition to promoting the wide culture of this area.

Growth is also planned for the "Bar La Valentina", having a presence in each municipality of the state of Aguascalientes and in this way this place is recognized by the young people of each entity and thus they can have a place of healthy coexistence.

Thanks to the efforts of Margarita Gallegos as mayor, in the coming months the construction of the new level crossing will begin on the entire main avenue of the municipal seat, so that people who are just passing through, can take this artery without entering the intense traffic of the municipal head.

Soon the expansion of the "Elías Sandoval" Baseball package is planned, due to the great acceptance that the "Gigantes de San Francisco" team has had, this venue currently has capacity for 700 people comfortably seated, it is planned to expand to a capacity of 80,000 attendees comfortably seated in 3 levels of stands, in addition to adding 700 boxes, restaurants among other attractions, this venue will also serve to host concerts of regional stature such as Pichi Macias, Grupo K-Libre among other artists in the region, it is also planned to be a property of high importance worldwide.

References

1962 births
Living people
People from Aguascalientes
Women members of the Chamber of Deputies (Mexico)
Members of the Chamber of Deputies (Mexico) for Aguascalientes
Institutional Revolutionary Party politicians
21st-century Mexican politicians
21st-century Mexican women politicians
Deputies of the LXI Legislature of Mexico